Kiszka (plural Kiszkowie) was a noble family (szlachta) and one of the most powerful families (magnates) of the Grand Duchy of Lithuania in the Polish–Lithuanian Commonwealth. Originating from Mazovia, the family used the Dąbrowa Coat of Arms.

History
In the 15th century the family moved from Mazovia to Grand Duchy of Lithuania. It reached magnate status in the 16th century. The family continued for five generations and had 29 members. The family had numerous possessions, most of them in Podlasie, Vilnius Voivodeship, Polesie and Volhynia.

Family tree
Incomplete family tree is presented below:

References

External links
 https://web.archive.org/web/20130921183324/http://mariusz.eu.pn/genealogia/rody/kiszkowie01.html